Attali is a Jewish surname originated from the Arab word "attâl" (porter). Notable people with the surname include:

 Bernard Attali (born 1943), French businessman
 Jacques Attali (born 1943), Algerian-French economist and scholar

References 

Arab-Jewish surnames